USS Cornel (AN-45/YN-64) was an  which served with the U.S. Navy in the South Pacific Ocean theatre of operations during World War II.  Her career was without major incident, and she returned home safely after the war.

Launched in Washington
Cornel (AN-45) was launched 21 April 1944 by Everett Pacific Shipbuilding and Dry Dock Company, Everett, Washington, under a Maritime Commission contract; sponsored by Mrs. P. Pigott; and commissioned 6 June 1944.

World War II service
Cornel sailed in convoy from San Pedro, California, 6 August 1944 for Eniwetok, arriving 15 September. On 9 October she reported at Ulithi to maintain nets, and except for short periods at Peleliu, in the Palau Islands, Cornel remained at Ulithi tending nets until the end of the war, then dismantling and salvaging them. She cleared Ulithi 17 October 1945 and arrived at San Pedro, California, 29 November.

Post-war decommissioning
Cornel remained at San Pedro until decommissioned 15 February 1946. She was returned to the U.S. Maritime Commission for disposal 29 January 1947.

References 
  
 NavSource Online: Service Ship Photo Archive - YN-64 / AN-45 Cornel

 

Ailanthus-class net laying ships of the United States Navy
Ships built by Everett-Pacific Shipbuilding & Dry Dock Company
1944 ships
World War II net laying ships of the United States